Test of the Samurai is an adventure module published in 1990 for the second edition of theAdvanced Dungeons & Dragons fantasy role-playing game.

Plot summary
Test of the Samurai is a Kara-Tur adventure scenario in which the player characters explore the unusual occurrences and monsters appearing in the Wa peninsula.

Publication history
OA7 Test of the Samurai was written by Rick Swan, with a cover by Jim Holloway, and was published by TSR in 1990 as an 80-page booklet with a large color map and an outer folder.

Reception

Reviews

References

Dungeons & Dragons modules
Forgotten Realms adventures
Role-playing game supplements introduced in 1990